Drew Pearson may refer to:

 Drew Pearson (journalist) (1897–1969), American columnist
 Drew Pearson (American football) (born 1951), American football player
 Drew Pearson (songwriter) (born ca. 1981), American songwriter

See also
Andrew Pearson (disambiguation)